Sveti Duh na Ostrem Vrhu is a dispersed settlement in the hills north of Selnica ob Dravi in northeastern Slovenia, right on the border with Austria.

It gets its name from the local parish church dedicated to the Holy Spirit. It is a single-nave building with a belfry, dating to 1675. Right next to it is a second, smaller church, dedicated to Saint Augustine. It was built in 1693.

References

External links
Sveti Duh na Ostrem Vrhu on Geopedia

Populated places in the Municipality of Selnica ob Dravi